John McLusky (20 January 1923 – 5 September 2006) was a comics artist best known as the original artist of the comic strip featuring Ian Fleming's James Bond.

Biography
Hector John Dewhirst McLusky was born in Glasgow, Scotland. He eventually moved with his two brothers, sister and parents, to Leeds, Yorkshire. They moved from Leeds to Leamington Spa in 1936.  John (also known as Hector) attended Warwick School from 1936 to 1940, and, after a period back in Leeds, proceeded to the Slade School of Art where he held the position of Art Teacher.

WARTIME EXPERIENCES - Information to follow

John McLusky began illustrating the comic strip adaptation of James Bond for the Daily Express. From 1958 to 1966, McLusky adapted 13 of Ian Fleming's James Bond novels or short stories.

After Yaroslav Horak had taken over the James Bond strip, McLusky drew Secret Agent 13 for Fleetway. For the magazine TV Comic McLusky illustrated several strips over 15 years, notably Look and Learn and strip adaptations for Laurel & Hardy, and the Pink Panther. In 1982 McLusky returned to illustrate the James Bond strip, collaborating with writer Jim Lawrence to illustrate four new original James Bond stories.

John McLusky continued other work throughout his career – including several years as Art History Lecturer and substitute teaching in Art & Art History. A passion of his was working as a Punch & Judy puppeteer on Bournemouth Pier & Filey in Yorkshire. He became a Professor of Punch & Judy which was in recognition of his knowledge & services to this time honoured tradition.

James Bond strips

Other work
 The Paradise Plot (1981-1982)
 Deathmask (1982–1983)
 Flittermouse (1983)
 Polestar (1983)
 The Scent Of Danger (1984)

Sources

External links
 John McLusky biography on Lambiek Comiclopedia
 John McLusky's artwork

1923 births
2006 deaths
British comics artists
British comic strip cartoonists